In mathematics, especially in order theory, a maximal element of a subset S of some preordered set is an element of S that is not smaller than any other element in S. A minimal element of a subset S of some preordered set is defined dually as an element of S that is not greater than any other element in S.

The notions of maximal and minimal elements are weaker than those of greatest element and least element which are also known, respectively, as maximum and minimum. In the particular case of a partially ordered set, while there can be at most one maximum and at most one minimum there may be multiple maximal or minimal elements. Specializing further to totally ordered sets, the notions of maximal element and maximum coincide, and the notions of minimal element and minimum coincide.

As an example, in the collection

ordered by containment, the element {d, o} is minimal as it contains no sets in the collection, the element {g, o, a, d} is maximal as there are no sets in the collection which contain it, the element {d, o, g} is neither, and the element {o, a, f} is both minimal and maximal. By contrast, neither a maximum nor a minimum exists for 

Zorn's lemma states that every partially ordered set for which every totally ordered subset has an upper bound contains at least one maximal element. This lemma is equivalent to the well-ordering theorem and the axiom of choice and implies major results in other mathematical areas like the Hahn–Banach theorem, the Kirszbraun theorem, Tychonoff's theorem, the existence of a Hamel basis for every vector space, and the existence of an algebraic closure for every field.

Definition 

Let  be a preordered set and let   is an element  such that 

if  satisfies  then necessarily  

Similarly,  is an element  such that 

if  satisfies  then necessarily  

If the preordered set  also happens to be a partially ordered set (or more generally, if the restriction  is a partially ordered set) then  is a maximal element of  if and only if  contains no element strictly greater than  explicitly, this means that there does not exist any element  such that  and  
The characterization for minimal elements is obtained by using  in place of

Existence and uniqueness 

Maximal elements need not exist.

Example 1: Let  where  denotes the real numbers. For all   but  (that is,  but not ). 
Example 2: Let  where  denotes the rational numbers and where  is irrational.

In general  is only a partial order on  If  is a maximal element and  then it remains possible that neither  nor  This leaves open the possibility that there exist more than one maximal elements.

Example 4: Let A be a set with at least two elements and let  be the subset of the power set  consisting of singleton subsets, partially ordered by  This is the discrete poset where no two elements are comparable and thus every element  is maximal (and minimal); moreover, for any distinct  neither  nor

Greatest elements 
For arbitrary members  exactly one of the following cases applies:
;
;
;
Given a subset  and some 
Thus the definition of a greatest element is stronger than that of a maximal element.

Equivalently, a greatest element of a subset  can be defined as an element of  that is greater than every other element of  
A subset may have at most one greatest element.

By contraposition, if  has several maximal elements, it cannot have a greatest element; see example 3.
If  satisfies the ascending chain condition, a subset  of  has a greatest element if, and only if, it has one maximal element.

This is not a necessary condition: whenever  has a greatest element, the notions coincide, too, as stated above.
If the notions of maximal element and greatest element coincide on every two-element subset  of  then  is a total order on

Directed sets 
In a totally ordered set, the terms maximal element and greatest element coincide, which is why both terms are used interchangeably in fields like analysis where only total orders are considered. This observation applies not only to totally ordered subsets of any partially ordered set, but also to their order theoretic generalization via directed sets. In a directed set, every pair of elements (particularly pairs of incomparable elements) has a common upper bound within the set. If a directed set has a maximal element, it is also its greatest element, and hence its only maximal element. For a directed set without maximal or greatest elements, see examples 1 and 2 above.

Similar conclusions are true for minimal elements.

Further introductory information is found in the article on order theory.

Properties 
 Each finite nonempty subset  has both maximal and minimal elements. An infinite subset need not have any of them, for example, the integers  with the usual order.
The same applies to minimal elements.

Examples 
 In Pareto efficiency, a Pareto optimum is a maximal element with respect to the partial order of Pareto improvement, and the set of maximal elements is called the Pareto frontier.
 In decision theory, an admissible decision rule is a maximal element with respect to the partial order of dominating decision rule.
 In modern portfolio theory, the set of maximal elements with respect to the product order on risk and return is called the efficient frontier.
 In set theory, a set is finite if and only if every non-empty family of subsets has a minimal element when ordered by the inclusion relation.
 In abstract algebra, the concept of a maximal common divisor is needed to generalize greatest common divisors to number systems in which the common divisors of a set of elements may have more than one maximal element.
 In computational geometry, the maxima of a point set are maximal with respect to the partial order of coordinatewise domination.

Consumer theory
In economics, one may relax the axiom of antisymmetry, using preorders (generally total preorders) instead of partial orders; the notion analogous to maximal element is very similar, but different terminology is used, as detailed below.

In consumer theory the consumption space is some set , usually the positive orthant of some vector space so that each  represents a quantity of consumption specified for each existing commodity in the
economy. In this context, for any  an element  is said to be a maximal element if
 implies 

It should be remarked that the formal definition looks very much like that of a greatest element for an ordered set. However, when  is only a preorder, an element  with the property above behaves very much like a maximal element in an ordering. For instance, a maximal element  is not unique for  does not preclude the possibility that  (while  and  do not imply  but simply indifference ). The notion of greatest element for a preference preorder would be that of most preferred choice.
 implies 

An obvious application is to the definition of demand correspondence. An element  is called a price functional or price system and maps every consumption bundle  into its market value . The budget correspondence is a correspondence  mapping any price system and any level of income into a subset

Related notions 
A subset  of a partially ordered set  is said to be cofinal if for every  there exists some  such that  Every cofinal subset of a partially ordered set with maximal elements must contain all maximal elements.

A subset  of a partially ordered set  is said to be a lower set of  if it is downward closed: if  and  then  Every lower set  of a finite ordered set  is equal to the smallest lower set containing all maximal elements of

See also

Notes 

Proofs

References 

Order theory